The Chalcolithic or Copper Age is the transitional period between the Neolithic and the Bronze Age. 
It is taken to begin around the mid-5th millennium BC, and ends with the beginning of the Bronze Age proper, in the late 4th to 3rd millennium BC, depending on the region.

The Chalcolithic is part of prehistory, but based on archaeological evidence, the emergence of the first state societies can be inferred, notably in the Fertile Crescent (Sumer, Predynastic Egypt, Proto-Minoan Crete), with late Neolithic societies of comparable complexity emerging in the Indus Valley (Mehrgarh), China, and along the north-western shores of the Black Sea.

The development of states—large-scale, populous, politically centralized, and socially stratified polities/societies governed by powerful rulers—marks one of the major milestones in the evolution of human societies. Archaeologists often distinguish between primary (or pristine) states and secondary states. Primary states evolved independently through largely internal developmental processes rather than through the influence of any other pre-existing state.

The earliest known primary states appeared in Mesopotamia c. 3700 BC,, in Greece c. 3500 BC, in Egypt c. 3300 BC, 
in the Indus Valley c. 3300 BC,
and in China c. 1600 BC.

List of known polities

See also
4th millennium BC
Cradle of civilization
List of Bronze Age states
List of Iron Age states

References

State society
Chalcolithic states